Arabian Nights is the second studio album recorded by American female vocal trio The Ritchie Family, released in 1976 on the Marlin label.

History
The album features the track, "The Best Disco in Town", which peaked at No. 1 on the Hot Dance/Disco chart, No. 17 on the Billboard Hot 100, and No. 12 on the Hot Soul Singles chart.

Track listing

Personnel
Cheryl Mason Jacks, Cassandra Ann Wooten, Gwendolyn Oliver – vocals
Don Renaldo – strings, horns
Richie Rome – electric piano, acoustic piano
Earl Young, Charles Collins – drums
Ron Baker, Michael "Sugar Bear" Foreman – bass
Craig Snyder, Norman Harris, Bobby Eli – guitars
Nick D'Amico – percussion
Larry Washington, – congas
Buddy Turner, Johnny Belmon, Jerry Atkins, James Gitp, Craig Jamerson, William Brown – male vocals

Production
Jacques Morali, Richie Rome – producers, arrangers
Henri Belolo – general supervisor
Joe Tarsia, Jay Mark, Ken Present – engineers
Michael Hutchinson, Jeff Stewart, Pete Humphreys – assistant engineers
Vivian Abbott – time coordinator
John Galluzzi – photographer

Charts

Certifications and sales

References

External links
 

1976 albums
The Ritchie Family albums
Albums produced by Jacques Morali
Albums recorded at Sigma Sound Studios
Marlin Records albums